Diosvelis Alejandro Guerra Santiesteban (born 21 May 1989) is a Cuban international footballer who plays for Cienfuegos and the Cuba national football team.

Club career
Uncommon in Cuba, Guerra played for 6 different Cuban provincial teams, starting his senior career with Granma.

International career
He made his international debut for Cuba in an August 2014 friendly match against Panama and has, as of January 2018, earned a total of 17 caps, scoring no goals. He represented his country in 1 FIFA World Cup qualification match and was called up to the Cuba team for the 2015 CONCACAF Gold Cup. He played in Cuba's opening game against Mexico, a 6–0 loss. And reached the quarter finals but were eliminated by United States 6–0.

References

External links
 

1989 births
Living people
Cuban footballers
Cuba international footballers
Association football goalkeepers
CF Granma players
FC Artemisa players
FC Pinar del Río players
FC Ciego de Ávila players
FC Cienfuegos players
FC Camagüey players
2013 CONCACAF Gold Cup players
2015 CONCACAF Gold Cup players
People from San Antonio de los Baños
21st-century Cuban people